is a Buddhist temple in the Saga district of Ukyō-ku, Kyoto, Japan. It is also known as Saga Shaka-dō. It is devoted to the practice of Yuzu Nembutsu. Initially, the temple belonged to the Kegon sect; then it became a Pure Land temple. The honzon is an image of Gautama Buddha (Shaka-nyorai). The wooden statue is a National Treasure of Japan, and is an example of a hibutsu. Seiryō-ji also possesses National Treasure statues of the Amitābha (Amida) trinity, and other National Treasures and Important Cultural Properties.

The tomb of Minamoto no Tōru, sometimes mentioned as the model for Hikaru Genji in important Japanese literary classic The Tale of Genji, resides here.

See also
List of National Treasures of Japan (paintings)
List of National Treasures of Japan (sculptures)
Thirteen Buddhist Sites of Kyoto

References

Buddhist temples in Kyoto